The  is a Japanese railway line connecting Shimodate Station, in Chikusei, Ibaraki and Motegi Station in Motegi, Tochigi. The third sector company took over the former JR East line in 1988. In addition to regular diesel local trains, the line also operates the SL Mooka steam service for tourists using C11 and C12 class steam locomotives.

History
 1 April 1912: 16.5 km  line opens between Shimodate and Mooka.
 15 December 1920: Entire line opened to Motegi (route length of 42.0 km). The proposed extension to Nagakura was not constructed.
 2 September 1922: Line renamed Mooka Line.
 1 November 1982: Freight services discontinued.
 11 September 1984: Line closure approved.
 11 April 1988: JR line closes and becomes Mooka Railway Mooka Line. Route length is reduced to 41.9 km.
 27 March 1994: SL Mooka steam train operation starts.
 30 July 2020: JNR Class C11 steam locomotive #325 moved to Tobu Railway.

Rolling stock
(As of October 2022)
 Mooka 14 diesel railcars x9
DE10 Class diesel locomotive #1535
 JNR Class C12 steam locomotive #66
 OHa & OHaFu coaches x3

Stations
 The SL Mooka stops at stations marked with "●" and passes stations marked "｜".
 To take the SL Mooka, passengers must purchase the SL ticket (500 yen) via Mooka Railways SL Guide and reserve their seats at least a day in advance.
 There is "SL・DL Rapid" service only on days SL Mooka is  operated. And, boarding on this service costs only fares.

See also
List of railway companies in Japan
List of railway lines in Japan

References
This article incorporates material from the corresponding article in the Japanese Wikipedia

Railway lines in Japan
Rail transport in Tochigi Prefecture
Rail transport in Ibaraki Prefecture
Railway lines opened in 1912
1067 mm gauge railways in Japan
1912 establishments in Japan
Japanese third-sector railway lines
Heritage railways in Japan